Glecaprevir (INN,) is a hepatitis C virus (HCV) nonstructural (NS) protein 3/4A protease inhibitor that was identified jointly by AbbVie and Enanta Pharmaceuticals. It is being developed as a treatment of chronic hepatitis C infection in co-formulation with an HCV NS5A inhibitor pibrentasvir. Together they demonstrated potent antiviral activity against major HCV genotypes and high barriers to resistance in vitro.

On 19 December 2016, AbbVie submitted a new drug application to the U.S. Food and Drug Administration for the glecaprevir/pibrentasvir (trade name Mavyret) regimen for the treatment of all major genotypes (1–6) of chronic hepatitis C. On 3 August 2017 the FDA approved the combination for hepatitis C treatment. In Europe, it was approved on 17 August 2017 for the same indication, under the trade name Maviret.

See also 
 Protease inhibitor (pharmacology)

References 

Carboxamides
Carbamates
Cyclopropanes
AbbVie brands
Ethers
NS3/4A protease inhibitors
Organofluorides
Pyrrolidines
Quinoxalines
Sulfonamides
Tert-butyl compounds
Cyclopentanes